Pingshan Township, is a rural township in Zhuzhou County, Zhuzhou City, Hunan Province, People's Republic of China.

Cityscape
The township is divided into 9 villages and 1 community including Pingshan Community, Pingshan Village, Xingqiao Village, Guanfang Village, Quantanghu Village, Longtan Village, Baiyu Village, Huashi Village, Hongshi Village, and Huangnitang Village.

References

Historic township-level divisions of Zhuzhou County